Turner-White Casket Co. Building was a historic loft building located at Baltimore, Maryland, United States. It was a six-story loft building constructed in 1893 in the Romanesque style.  Its façade organization and detailing featured brick, stone, and cast iron elements. It was two bays wide and six stories high with a full basement.

It was constructed as a factory with street level display rooms that was rehabilitated in the 1990s.  The Turner-White Casket Co. occupied the building from 1931 to 1965.  A 2012 photograph shows that a parking lot now occupies the building site.

Turner-White Casket Co. Building was listed on the National Register of Historic Places in 1995.

References

External links
, including photo from 1984, at Maryland Historical Trust

Cast-iron architecture in Baltimore
Downtown Baltimore
Industrial buildings and structures on the National Register of Historic Places in Baltimore
Industrial buildings completed in 1893
Romanesque Revival architecture in Maryland